Moqiseh (also Romanized as Moqīseh; also known as Magīsā, Makisa, and Moghīs̄eh) is a village in Mehr Rural District, Bashtin District, Davarzan County, Razavi Khorasan Province, Iran. At the 2006 census, its population was 644, in 221 families.

References 

Populated places in Davarzan County